Yaginumena is a genus of comb-footed spiders that was first described by H. Yoshida in 2002.  it contains three species, found in Asia and Turkey: Y. castrata, Y. maculosa, and Y. mutilata.

See also
 List of Theridiidae species

References

Further reading

Araneomorphae genera
Spiders of Asia
Spiders of Russia
Theridiidae